Origami is the traditional Japanese folk art of paper folding.

Origami may also refer to:

Bulbophyllum origami, a species of orchid
DNA origami, the folding of DNA to create two- and three-dimensional shapes at the nanoscale
Origami (magic trick), a stage illusion with a Japanese paperfolding theme
Project Origami, an early codename for Microsoft's Ultra-Mobile PC
Paper Mario: The Origami King, a Nintendo Switch game in the Paper Mario series
Origami (film), a 2017 Canadian science fiction film directed by Patrick Demers